William De Vaull (December 12, 1870 – June 4, 1945) - also credited as William P. DeVaull - was an American film actor. He appeared in more than thirty films from 1915 to 1927.

Filmography

References

External links
 

1870 births
1945 deaths
Male actors from San Francisco
American male silent film actors
American male film actors
20th-century American male actors